The 2012 United States presidential straw poll in Guam was held on November 6, 2012. Guam is a territory and not a state. Thus, it is ineligible to elect members of the Electoral College, who would then in turn cast direct electoral votes for president and for vice president. To draw attention to this fact, the territory conducts a non-binding presidential straw poll during the general election as if they did elect members to the Electoral College.

The territory still participated in the U.S. presidential caucuses and primaries like the other states and territories.

Incumbent president and Democratic Party nominee Barack Obama won the poll with over 70% of the vote.

Results

Votes cast by village

See also 
 2012 United States presidential election
 2012 Guam Democratic presidential caucuses
 2012 Guam Republican presidential caucuses

References

Guam
2012
2012 Guam elections